Presence is a 1992 Russian drama film directed by Andrey Dobrovolskiy.

Plot 
The film tells about a lonely man who has only memories of his beloved woman, which cannot be returned. Or is it still possible?

Cast 
 Aleksey Petrenko as Petya
 Aleksandra Butorina as Liza, a girl
 Aleksandr Adabashyan as Nikolai
 Olga Antonova as Natalia
 Lidiya Savchenko as the woman on the bench
 Vadim Gems	as 	 port worker
 Konstantin Vorobyov as port worker
 Konstantin Berdikov	 as port worker
 Afanasi Trishkin  as port worker
 Leonid Filatkin  as port worker

References

External links 
 

1992 films
1990s Russian-language films
Russian drama films
1992 drama films
Films scored by Alfred Schnittke